Balep Ba Ndoumbouk (born October 24, 1987) is an Armenian football player of Cameroonian ethnic origin. He has played for Armenia national team.

National team statistics

References

1987 births
Living people
Cameroonian footballers
Armenian footballers
Armenia international footballers
FC Pyunik players
Armenian Premier League players
Cameroonian emigrants to Armenia
Naturalized citizens of Armenia
Association football midfielders